Flockton's were a series of architectural firms in the 19th and early 20th centuries, based in Sheffield, England. The firms were responsible for a number of significant buildings, particularly in the Sheffield area.

William Flockton

William Flockton (1804–1864) was the son of Thomas Flockton, a carpenter and builder in Sheffield. He was brought up in his father's trade and established himself as an architect in 1833. From 1845 to 1849 he operated the business with William Lee and his son Thomas James Flockton as Flockton, Lee and Flockton, continuing in partnership with Thomas James Flockton as Flockton & Son until his death on 24 September 1864.

Buildings

Thomas James Flockton
Thomas James Flockton (1823–1899), the son of William Flockton, was born in Sheffield on 21 May 1823. He started working with his father at the age of 12 before spending two years in London employed by Sir Gilbert Scott. He returned to Sheffield in 1845 and entered into partnership with his father. Two years before his father's death he became partners with George Lewslie Abbott, as Flockton & Abbott. After George Abbott retired in 1877 Edward Mitchel Gibbs entered the partnership as Flockton & Gibbs, finally being joined by Thomas Flockton's son Charles Burrows Flockton (1867–1945) in 1895 as Flockton, Gibbs & Flockton.

Buildings

References

Architecture firms based in Sheffield
English ecclesiastical architects
Defunct companies based in Sheffield
19th-century establishments in England
20th-century disestablishments in England